Brigadier Harold Edward Cohen,  (25 November 1881 – 29 October 1946) was an Australian soldier, lawyer and, like his grandfather Edward Cohen, a Victorian State politician.

Early life
Cohen was the son of Montague and Annie Cohen and born in St Kilda, Melbourne. He married Freda Pirani on 4 December 1907, and they had two sons and two daughters. Cohen was educated at Xavier College where he was the first Jewish boy to attend the school. He was School Captain in 1898 was President of the Old Xaverians Association from 1919-1920. 

He continued his studies at Melbourne University. Prior to being a politician, Cohen was a solicitor, soldier and a company director.

Political career
In 1929, Cohen was elected as a Nationalist Party MP for Melbourne South Province in the Victorian Legislative Council. Cohen was Assistant Treasurer from 1932 until March 1935, Minister of Public Instruction and Solicitor-General from 20 March to 2 April 1935 in the government of Stanley Argyle.

In 1935, he changed to the Victorian Legislative Assembly and was elected to Caulfield and was member for Caulfield until his defeat in 1943.

Scouting
Cohen served as Chief Commissioner of Scouts Victoria from 1919 to 1921.

References

1881 births
1946 deaths
Military personnel from Melbourne
Australian brigadiers
Australian military personnel of World War I
Australian Army personnel of World War II
Australian people of English-Jewish descent
Australian Companions of the Distinguished Service Order
Australian Companions of the Order of St Michael and St George
Politicians from Melbourne
Members of the Victorian Legislative Assembly
Members of the Victorian Legislative Council
Solicitors-General of Victoria
Jewish Australian politicians
United Australia Party members of the Parliament of Victoria
Nationalist Party of Australia members of the Parliament of Victoria
20th-century Australian politicians
People from St Kilda, Victoria